The Kigali International Peace Marathon is an annual road-based marathon hosted by Kigali, Rwanda, since 2005.  It is a World Athletics Label Road Race and a member of the Association of International Marathons and Distance Races.  During the race weekend, a half marathon and a 10K fun run are also offered.  A night run is also associated with the event, though not held during the same weekend.

History 

In 2004, during the aftermath of the Rwandan genocide a decade earlier, Soroptimist International decided to organize a marathon to promote the development of peace through sports.

The 2020 edition of the race was postponed twice before being cancelled due to the coronavirus pandemic.

Course 

The marathon begins and ends in front of BK Arena.  It consists of two loops, which half marathoners run once.

Winners

See also 
 Košice Peace Marathon
 World Peace Marathon

Notes

References

External links 
 Official website

2004 establishments in Rwanda
Annual events in Rwanda
Athletics competitions in Rwanda
Marathons in Africa
May sporting events
Recurring sporting events established in 2004
Sport in Kigali